The 339th Bombardment Squadron is an inactive United States Air Force unit.  It was last assigned to the 96th Bombardment Wing at Dyess Air Force Base, Texas, where it was inactivated on 15 March 1963.

The squadron was first activated during World War II.  It served in the European Theater of Operations, where it participated in the strategic bombing campaign against Germany and earned two Distinguished Unit Citations for its combat actions.  Following V-E Day, the squadron returned to the United States and was inactivated.

This squadron was again active from 1947 to 1949 in the reserves, although it was apparently never fully manned or equipped.  It was active as a Boeing B-47 Stratojet squadron in Strategic Air Command from 1953 to 1963.

History

World War II

Initial organization and training
The squadron was activated at Salt Lake City Army Air Base in July 1942 as the 339th Bombardment Squadron, one of the original squadrons of the 96th Bombardment Group.  In early August the squadron moved to Gowen Field, Idaho, where it received its initial cadre, then, later that month to Walla Walla Army Air Base, Washington to begin training with the Boeing B-17 Flying Fortress.  On 1 November, the squadron moved to Pocatello Army Air Field, Idaho, where it began to act as a Operational Training Unit.  It moved to Pyote Army Air Base, Texas in January 1943 and resumed training for overseas movement.

The air echelon of the squadron began ferrying their B-17s via the North Atlantic ferry route, stopping at Presque Isle Army Air Field, Newfoundland, Iceland, then at Prestwick Airport, Scotland on 4 April 1943.

Combat in the European Theater

The squadron was established at RAF Great Saling by 12 May, and flew its first combat mission the next day, an attack against the airfield at Saint-Omer, France.  However, the squadron was late assembling and did not complete the mission.  The following day, it made its first strike on a target, an airfield at Courtrai. Eighth Air Force decided to transfer its new Martin B-26 Marauder units from VIII Bomber Command to VIII Air Support Command and concentrate them on bases closer to the European continent.  As a result, the 322d Bombardment Group moved to Great Saling on 12 June, forcing the 96th Group and its squadrons to relocate to RAF Snetterton Heath, which would be its combat station for the rest of the war.

The squadron engaged in the strategic bombing campaign against Germany.  It attacked airdromes, aircraft factories, harbors, oil refineries, railway yards, shipyards, and other industrial targets in Germany, France, the Netherlands, Belgium, Norway, Poland, Hungary, and Czechoslovakia.  Targets included airfields at Bordeaux and Augsburg; marshalling yards at Kiel, Hamm, Braunschweig, and Gdynia; aircraft factories at Chemnitz, Hanover, and Diósgyőr; oil refineries at Merseburg and Brüx, and chemical works in Wiesbaden, Ludwigshafen, and Neunkirchen

During an attack on the Messerschmitt factory at Regensberg on 17 August 1943, the squadron was without escort after its escorting Republic P-47 Thunderbolts reached the limit of their range. It withstood repeated attacks, first by enemy Messerschmitt Bf 109 and Focke-Wulf Fw 190 interceptors, then by Messerschmitt Bf 110 and Junkers Ju 88 night fighters, to strike its target, earning its first Distinguished Unit Citation (DUC).  This was a "shuttle" mission, with the squadron recovering on bases in North Africa, rather than returning to England.

The squadron formed part of the leading 45th Combat Bombardment Wing formation on very long-range mission against the Focke-Wulf Fw 190 factory at Poznan  Heavy clouds led an entire wing and some combat boxes of the 45th Wing to abandon the mission and return to England.  The 96th Group and one other combat box proceded to the target and were surprised to find they were able to bomb visually, although the target was defended by intense flak fire, earning the squadron its second DUC.  

In addition to strategic operations, the squadron participated in air support and interdiction missions. In the preparation for Operation Overlord, the invasion of Normandy, it bombed coastal defenses, railway bridges, gun emplacements, and field batteries in the battle area prior to and during D-Day in June 1944.  It attacked enemy positions in support of Operation Cobra, the breakout at Saint Lo in July 1944, aiding the campaign in France in August by striking roads and road junctions, and by dropping supplies to the Maquis. During the early months of 1945, it attacked the communications supplying German armies on the western front.

After V-E Day, the 339th flew food missions to the Netherlands and hauled redeployed personnel to French Morocco, Ireland, France, and Germany. The squadron was scheduled for occupation duty, but that plan was cancelled in September 1945. In November 1945 its aircraft were flown back to the United States or transferred to other units in Europe.  The unit's remaining personnel returned to the United States and it was inactivated at the Port of Embarkation on 29 November 1945.

Reserve operations
The squadron was activated in the reserves under Air Defense Command (ADC) at Jackson Army Air Base, Misissippi on 29 May 1947, and was again assigned to the 96th Group, stationed at Gunter Field, Alabama.  In October, the squadron was reassigned to the 384th Bombardment Group at Nashville Municipal Airport, Tennessee.  At Jackson, the squadron's training was supervised by the 4103rd AAF Base Unit (Reserve Training), later the 2588th AF Reserve Flying Training Center.  In 1948, Continental Air Command (ConAC) assumed responsibility for managing reserve and Air National Guard units from ADC.

The squadron does not appear to have been fully manned or equipped with operational aircraft.  In 1949, as ConAC was reorganizing its operational units under the Wing Base Organization system, President Truman’s reduced 1949 defense budget required reductions in the number of flying units in the Air Force, and the 339th was inactivated.

Strategic Air Command
Reactivated at Altus Air Force Base, Oklahoma in 1953 as a Strategic Air Command Boeing B-47 Stratojet squadron.  Performed global deployments and training until inactivated in 1963.  With the phaseout of the B-47 the training aircraft sent to storage at Davis–Monthan and the squadron was inactivated.

Lineage
 Constituted as the 339th Bombardment Squadron (Heavy) on 28 January 1942
 Activated on 15 July 1942
 Redesignated 339th Bombardment Squadron, Heavy on c. 21 June 1943
 Inactivated on 19 December 1945
 Redesignated 339th Bombardment Squadron, Very Heavy on 13 May 1947
 Activated in the reserve on 29 May 1947
 Inactivated on 27 June 1949
 Redesignated 339th Bombardment Squadron, Medium on 6 November 1953
 Activated on 18 November 1953
 Inactivated on 15 March 1963

Assignments
 96th Bombardment Group, 15 July 1942 – 15 December 1945
 96th Bombardment Group, 29 May 1947
 384th Bombardment Group, 8 October 1947 – 27 June 1949
 96th Bombardment Wing (later 96th Strategic Aerospace Wing), 18 November 1953 – 15 March 1963

Stations

 Salt Lake City Army Air Base, Utah, 15 July 1942
 Gowen Field, Idaho, 6 August 1942
 Walla Walla Army Air Base, Washington, 16 August 1942
 Rapid City Army Air Base, South Dakota, 29 September 1942
 Pocatello Army Airfield, Idaho, 1 November 1942
 Pyote Army Air Base, Texas, 4 January – 16 April 1943

 RAF Great Saling (AAF-485), England, 12 May 1943
 RAF Snetterton Heath (AAF-138), England, 12 June 1943 – 11 December 1945
 Camp Kilmer, New Jersey, 17–19 December 1945
 Jackson Army Air Base, Mississippi, 29 May 1947 – 27 June 1949
 Altus Air Force Base, Oklahoma, 18 November 1953 – 15 March 1963

Aircraft
 Boeing B-17 Flying Fortress, 1943–1945
 Boeing B-47 Stratojet, 1955–1963

References

Notes
 Explanatory notes

 Citations

Bibliography

External links

Bombardment squadrons of the United States Air Force
Bombardment squadrons of the United States Army Air Forces
Military units and formations established in 1942